Dalia Amotz (12 August 1938 - 27 November 1994) was an Israeli photographer.

Biography 
Dalia Amotz, born in Kibbutz Gan Shmuel, she moved to Jerusalem from 1962. She was the daughter of Yaffa and Isaac Gleicher. In 1973 she presented her first solo exhibition, entitled "Dir Samit". In 1990 she won an Oscar Handler Prize from the Ghetto Fighters' Kibbutz. In 2000, an exhibition of her works was held at the Tel Aviv Museum  of Art entitled "The Dark Land, Fields of Light" as part her posthumously receiving the Constantiner Prize.

She died in 1994.

Collections
Dalia Amotz works are part of Israel Museum in Jerusalem.

Awards and recognition
 1977 The Enrique Kavlin Photography Prize, The Israel Museum, Jerusalem
 1990 Oskar Handler Award, Ghetto Fighters' House
 2000 The Constantiner Photography Award for an Israeli Artist, Tel Aviv Museum of Art

See also
Visual arts in Israel

References

External links 
 
 
 
 Dalia Amotz at the Gordon Gallery, Tel Aviv

1938 births
1994 deaths
Jewish Israeli artists
Israeli photographers
Israeli women photographers